The 1995 Scottish Claymores season was the inaugural season for the franchise in the World League of American Football (WLAF). The team played its home games at Murrayfield Stadium in Edinburgh, Scotland. They finished the regular season in sixth place with a record of two wins and eight losses.

The Claymores, after a 5–0 record in the preseason, surprisingly fired their head coach, Larry Kuharich, five days before their WLAF kickoff because "his coaching philosophy did not mesh with the make-up of the team". Special teams coordinator Jim Criner became head coach.

Offseason

NFL allocations

Personnel

Staff

Roster

Standings

Game summaries

Week 3: at Frankfurt Galaxy

Week 7: at Amsterdam Admirals

References

Scottish Claymores seasons